The Grand Tour is a British motoring television series for Amazon Prime Video, presented by Jeremy Clarkson, Richard Hammond, and James May. The programme focuses on conducting reviews of various models of car, new models and vintage classics, as well as tackling motoring-styled challenges and races, and features the use of studio segments between pre-recorded films.

The following is a list of episodes, listed in order of their original air date, along with information regarding featured cars that were reviewed and the main feature of the episode; for the second series only, the list also includes the celebrity guests who appeared on the programme. The Grand Tour conducted its studio segments via a travelling tent for the first series only, information pertaining its location is briefly described within the first sentence of the short summary for each listed episode of the respective series.

Series overview

Episodes

Series 1 (2016–17)
For the first series, with the exception of the two-part Namibia special, each episode featured studio segments filmed in a makeshift tent hosted across various foreign locales. Of these, two sites were each used for two separate but consecutive episodes. Although the series featured celebrities, most appeared in a minor capacity while others were mentioned or involved a look-alike - these appearances mainly were for a running gag involving them heading to meet the presenters in their tent for an interview, only to "die" in a freak accident.

Notes

Series 2 (2017–18)
From the second series on, the studio tent was set up at a permanent location in the Cotswolds. In addition, unlike the first series, celebrities were more fully involved in the programme, taking part in a feature involving head-to-head timed laps between two guests in each episode, with the exception of the final episode which was a special.

Series 3 (2019)
The third series discontinued the involvement of celebrity guests in order to provide more focus on films, and was the last series of regular episodes with studio segments, car reviews and timed laps. In acknowledgement of this format of the programme being brought to a close, the final episode's last segment included a montage of scenes featuring the presenters over the course of their career as a trio - not only from this programme, but also from their time hosting Top Gear.

Series 4 (2019–2021)
After the third series the tent format was eliminated and the programme shifted focus entirely onto occasional feature-length specials. Each episode in the season is marketed with the prefix; The Grand Tour Presents...

Series 5 (2022–present)

References

External links 
 
 
 The Grand Tour's channel on YouTube 

Lists of British non-fiction television series episodes
The Grand Tour (TV series)